Ectopia cordis (Greek: "away / out of place" + Latin: "heart") or ectopic heart is a congenital malformation in which the heart is abnormally located either partially or totally outside of the thorax.  The ectopic heart can be found along a spectrum of anatomical locations, including the neck, chest, or abdomen.  In most cases, the heart protrudes outside the chest through a split sternum.

Pathology
Ectopia cordis results from a failure of proper maturation of midline mesoderm and ventral body wall (chest) formation during embryonic development.  The exact etiology remains unknown, but abnormalities in the lateral body wall folds are believed to be involved.  Normally, the lateral body walls are responsible for fusion at the midline to form the ventral wall.  Corruption of this process may underlie ectopia cordis.

Defective ventral body wall formation yields a heart unprotected by the pericardium, sternum, or skin. Other organs may also have formed outside the skin, as well.  Many cases of ectopia cordis have associated congenital heart defects, in which the heart has failed to properly form.

Defects more commonly associated with ectopia cordis include:
 Intracardiac defects
 Atrial septal defect
 Ventricular septal defect
 Tetralogy of Fallot
 Tricuspid atresia
 Double outlet right ventricle
 Non-cardiac malformations
 Pentalogy of Cantrell
 Omphalocele
 Anterior diaphragmatic hernia
 Cleft palate

Diagnosis
The Diagnosis of ectopia cordis is found with a routine ultrasound as early as the first trimester or the beginning of the second trimester.

Treatment
Due to the rarity and rapid postpartum mortality of ectopia cordis, limited treatment options have been developed. Only some successful surgeries have been performed as of now, and the mortality rate remains high.

Prognosis
The prognosis of ectopia cordis depends on classification according to three factors:
 Location of the defect
 Cervical
 Thoracic
 Thoracoabdominal
 Abdominal
 Extent of the cardiac displacement
 Presence or absence of intracardiac defects

Some studies have suggested a better prognosis with surgery in cases of thoracoabdominal ectopia cordis or less severe pentalogy of Cantrell.  In general, the prognosis for ectopia cordis is poor—most cases result in death shortly after birth due to infection, hypoxemia, or cardiac failure.

Epidemiology
The occurrence of ectopia cordis is 8 per million births.  It is typically classified according to location of the ectopic heart, which includes:
 Cervical
 Thoracic
 Thoracoabdominal
 Abdominal

Thoracic and thoraco-abdominal ectopia cordis constitute the vast majority of known cases.

References

External links 

Rare diseases
Congenital heart defects